Marvin K. Dauner (December 4, 1927 – December 18, 2010) was an American farmer and politician.

Dauner was born in Keene Township, Clay County, Minnesota. Dauner lived in Hawley, Minnesota with his wife and family and was a farmer. Dauner served on the Hitterdal, Minnesota School Board from 1957 to 1966 and on the Clay County Commission from 1974 to 1986. He was a Democrat. Dauner served in the Minnesota House of Representatives from 1987 to 1996. He died at the Viking Manor Nursing Home in Ulen, Minnesota.

Notes

1927 births
2010 deaths
People from Hawley, Minnesota
Farmers from Minnesota
School board members in Minnesota
County commissioners in Minnesota
Democratic Party members of the Minnesota House of Representatives